
Gmina Sierakowice is a rural gmina (administrative district) in Kartuzy County, Pomeranian Voivodeship, in northern Poland.

It belongs to bilingual communes in Poland.

The gmina contains part of the protected area called Kashubian Landscape Park.

Villages
Gmina Sierakowice contains the villages and settlements of Ameryka, Bącka Huta, Bór, Borowy Las, Bukowo, Ciechomie, Dąbrowa Puzdrowska, Długi Kierz, Dolina Jadwigi, Gowidlinko, Gowidlino, Gowidlino-Wybudowanie, Jagodowo, Janowo, Jelonko, Kamienica Królewska, Kamienicka Huta, Kamienicki Młyn, Kamionka Gowidlińska, Karczewko, Karłowo, Karwacja, Kokwino, Koryta, Kowale, Kujaty, Kukówka, Łączki, Lemany, Leszczynki, Lisie Jamy, Łyśniewo Sierakowickie, Migi, Moczydło, Mojusz, Mojuszewska Huta, Mrozy, Nowa Ameryka, Nowalczysko, Olszewko, Paczewo, Pałubice, Patoki, Piekiełko, Poljańska, Poręby, Przylesie, Puzdrowo, Puzdrowski Młyn, Rębienica, Sierakowice, Sierakowice-Wybudowanie, Sierakowska Huta, Skrzeszewo, Smolniki, Sosnowa Góra, Srocze Góry, Stara Huta, Stara Maszyna, Szklana, Szopa, Szramnica, Tuchlinek, Tuchlino, Welk, Wygoda Sierakowska, Załakowo and Zarębisko.

Neighbouring gminas
Gmina Sierakowice is bordered by the gminas of Cewice, Chmielno, Czarna Dąbrówka, Kartuzy, Linia, Parchowo, Stężyca and Sulęczyno.

References
Polish official population figures 2006

Kashubia
Sierakowice
Kartuzy County
Bilingual communes in Poland